

Canada

Costa Rica

Cuba

Curacao

Guatemala

Honduras

Mexico

Panama

Trinidad and Tobago

United States

References

CONCACAF Futsal Championship
Futsal tournament squads